The 2007 NCAA Division I Men's Swimming and Diving Championships were contested in March 2007 at the University Aquatic Center at the University of Minnesota in Minneapolis, Minnesota at the 84th annual NCAA-sanctioned swim meet to determine the team and individual national champions of Division I men's collegiate swimming and diving in the United States.

Auburn again topped the team standings, finishing 169 points ahead of Stanford. It was the Tigers' fifth consecutive and seventh overall national title.

Team standings
Note: Top 10 only
(H) = Hosts
(DC) = Defending champions
Full results

See also
List of college swimming and diving teams

References

NCAA Division I Men's Swimming and Diving Championships
NCAA Division I Swimming And Diving Championships
NCAA Division I Men's Swimming And Diving Championships
NCAA Division I Men's Swimming and Diving Championships